Azoyú is a city and seat of the Azoyú Municipality, in the state of Guerrero, south-western Mexico.

References

Populated places in Guerrero